The following is a list of the monastic houses in Bedfordshire, England.

Alien houses are included, as are smaller establishments such as cells and notable monastic granges (particularly those with resident monks), and also camerae of the military orders of monks (Knights Templars and Knights Hospitaller).  The numerous monastic hospitals per se are not included here unless at some time the foundation had, or was purported to have the status or function of an abbey, priory, friary or preceptor/commandery.

The name of the county is given where there is reference to an establishment in another county.  Where the county has changed since the foundation's dissolution the modern county is given in parentheses, and in instances where the referenced foundation ceased to exist before the unification of England, the kingdom is given, followed by the modern county in parentheses.

See also
 List of monastic houses in England

Notes

References

Bibliography
 Binns, Alison (1989) Studies in the History of Medieval Religion 1: Dedications of Monastic Houses in England and Wales 1066–1216, Boydell
 Cobbett, William (1868) List of Abbeys, Priories, Nunneries, Hospitals, And Other Religious Foundations in England and Wales and in Ireland, Confiscated, Seized On, or Alienated by the Protestant "Reformation" Sovereigns and Parliaments
 Knowles, David & Hadcock, R. Neville (1971) Medieval Religious Houses England & Wales. Longman
 Morris, Richard (1979) Cathedrals and Abbeys of England and Wales, J. M. Dent & Sons Ltd.
 Thorold, Henry (1986) Collins Guide to Cathedrals, Abbeys and Priories of England and Wales, Collins
 Thorold, Henry (1993) Collins Guide to the Ruined Abbeys of England, Wales and Scotland, Collins
 Wright, Geoffrey N., (2004) Discovering Abbeys and Priories, Shire Publications Ltd.
 English Cathedrals and Abbeys, Illustrated, Odhams Press Ltd.
 Map of Monastic Britain, South Sheet, Ordnance Survey, 2nd edition, 1954

History of Bedfordshire
England in the High Middle Ages
Medieval sites in England
Houses in Bedfordshire
 
Bedfordshire
Bedfordshire
Archaeological sites in Bedfordshire
Church of England church buildings in Bedfordshire
Lists of buildings and structures in Bedfordshire